Piero Bianconi (1 June 1899 in Minusio – 5 June 1984 in Minusio) was a Swiss-Italian writer and academic.

He was the son of Alessandro and Margherita Rusconi and the brother of the poet Giovanni Bianconi. He graduated in Italian literature from the University of Freiburg and in 1935 received his doctorate. Between 1935 and 1936 he was reader in Italian at the University of Bern.

Works

 Ticino Arte, in Enciclopedia italiana, Istituto dell'Enciclopedia Italiana, Roma 1938, 820-822;
 Arte in Leventina, (con Arminio Janner, Istituto Editoriale Ticinese, Bellinzona 1939;
 Arte in Blenio. Guida della Valle, S.A. Grassi & Co., Bellinzona-Lugano 1944;
 Bellinzona e le Valli superiori del Ticino, La Baconnière, Neuchâtel 1948;
 Inventario delle cose d'Arte e di Antichità. I. Le Tre Valli Superiori. Leventina. Blenio. Riviera, S.A. Grassi & Co., Bellinzona 1948;
 Bartolomeo e Bernardino, in «Svizzera Italiana», 101, 1953, 9-20;
 Il polittico Torriani e la nostra «emigrazione» artistica, in «Svizzera Italiana», 103, 1953, 1-13;
 Sospetti bramantineschi, in «Svizzera Italiana», 104, 1954, 12-14;
 Bramantino, Fabbri, Milano 1965;
 La Pietà alla Madonna del Sasso. Locarno, in «Cooperazione», 13, 29 marzo 1969, 3;
 Albero genealogico, Pantarei, Lugano 1969;
 Occhi sul Ticino, con foto di Alberto Flammer, Tipografia Stazione SA - Locarno, 1972;
 Diario (1948-1949), in Renato Martinoni, Sabina Geiser Foglia (a cura di), Antologia di scritti, Armando Dadò Editore, Locarno 2001, 319-324;
 I ponti rotti di Locarno. Saggio sul Cinquecento, in «L'silio dei protestanit Locarnesi», 227-258, Armando Dadò Editore, Locarno 2005,

Bibliography 
  Mario Agliati, Per i settant'anni di Piero Bianconi (31 maggio 1969), in «Il Cantonetto», XVI-XVII, 1-2, Lugano 1969, 7-11.
  AA.VV., Per gli ottant'anni di Piero Bianconi, Tipografia Pedrazzini, Locarno 1979.
  Giovanni Orelli, Svizzera italiana, Editrice La Scuola, Brescia 1986, 157-161.
  Luciano Vaccaro, Giuseppe Chiesi, Fabrizio Panzera, Terre del Ticino. Diocesi di Lugano, Editrice La Scuola, Brescia 2003.

External links 
 
 https://web.archive.org/web/20151224103952/http://www.bibliomedia.ch/de/autoren/Bianconi_Piero/332.html

Italian-language writers
Swiss people of Italian descent
1899 births
1984 deaths
People from Minusio
20th-century Swiss writers